Ambrogio Portalupi (25 January 1943 – 5 January 1987) was an Italian racing cyclist. He won the 1966 Tour de Suisse and rode the Tour de France in 1965, 1967 and 1970.

Major results
1965
 3rd Trofeo Matteotti
1966
 1st  Overall Tour de Suisse
1st Stage 1
1969
 1st Stage 2 Tour de Suisse
 1st GP Valsassina

References 

1943 births
1987 deaths
Italian male cyclists
Tour de Suisse stage winners
Cyclists from the Province of Pavia